Zeri may refer to:

Zeri, a commune in Italy
Zeri, Iran, a village in Iran
Zeri Rural District, in Iran
A codename for Adobe's HTTP Dynamic Streaming
Federico Zeri, Italian historian
Zero Emissions Research and Initiatives